Connor Seabold (born January 24, 1996) is an American professional baseball pitcher for the Colorado Rockies of Major League Baseball (MLB). He has previously played in MLB for the Boston Red Sox.

Amateur career
Seabold attended Newport Harbor High School in Newport Beach, California. In 2013, as a junior, he had a 2–6 win–loss record with a 1.97 earned run average (ERA). As a senior in 2014, he pitched to a 3.80 ERA, striking out 57 batters in 46 innings pitched. He was selected by the Baltimore Orioles in the 19th round of the Major League Baseball (MLB) 2014 draft, but did not sign and instead chose to enroll at California State University, Fullerton, where he played college baseball.

In 2015, as a freshman at Cal State Fullerton, Seabold appeared in 22 games (making 11 starts), going 5–4 with a 3.26 ERA in 69 innings, striking out 76 while walking only 12. As a sophomore in 2016, Seabold became the Titan's Friday night starter a month into the year, pitching to a 7–6 record with a 2.48 ERA in 16 games (13 starts), striking out 96 and walking only nine in 83 innings. He was named to the All-Big West Conference second team. After the season, he played in the Cape Cod Baseball League for the Yarmouth–Dennis Red Sox, helping them win the league championship. In 2017, as a junior, Seabold started 18 games, going 11–5 with a 2.96 ERA, earning a spot on the All-Big West Conference first team.

Professional career

Philadelphia Phillies organization
After Seabold's junior year, he was selected by the Philadelphia Phillies in the third round (83rd overall) of the 2017 MLB draft. He signed with the Phillies for $525,000 and made his professional debut with the Williamsport Crosscutters of the Class A Short Season New York–Penn League, pitching to a 0.90 ERA over 10 innings. In 2018, he began the year with the Clearwater Threshers of the Class A-Advanced Florida State League before earning a promotion to the Reading Fightin Phils of the Double-A Eastern League in June. Over 23 starts between the two clubs, he compiled a 5–8 record with a 4.28 ERA and a 1.11 WHIP as he struck out 132 batters in  innings pitched. In 2019, he returned to Reading to begin the season, and also spent time back with Clearwater. Over seven starts with Reading, he went 3–1 with a 2.25 ERA, while compiling a 1.00 ERA over two games with Clearwater. He missed time during the year with an oblique injury. After the season, he made four starts in the Arizona Fall League for the Scottsdale Scorpions, going 1–0 with a 1.06 ERA as he struck out 22 batters in 17 innings. In October, he was selected to the United States national baseball team for the 2019 WBSC Premier12, but he did not pitch in the tournament.

Boston Red Sox
On August 21, 2020, Seabold was traded to the Boston Red Sox, along with Nick Pivetta, in exchange for Brandon Workman, Heath Hembree and cash. On November 20, 2020, he was added to Boston's 40-man roster. Seabold began the 2021 season on the injured list due to elbow soreness. He returned to pitching in July and was assigned to the Triple-A Worcester Red Sox. On September 11, Seabold was added to Boston's active roster to make his major league debut. He started that night against the Chicago White Sox at Guaranteed Rate Field, allowing two runs on three hits in three innings, and was optioned back to Worcester the next day. In 11 starts with Worcester, Seabold compiled a 3.50 ERA and  a 4–3 record while striking out 52 batters in 54 innings. After the regular season, Seabold was selected to play in the Arizona Fall League.

Seabold began the 2022 season in Triple-A with Worcester. He was added to Boston's active roster for a start against the Toronto Blue Jays on June 27; after taking the loss, he was optioned back to Worcester. He was recalled by Boston on July 3 for a start at Wrigley Field, resulting in a no decision, and optioned back to Triple-A the next day. He was recalled on July 8, when Michael Wacha was placed on the injured list. The next day, Seabold himself was added to the injured list with a right forearm extensor strain. Seabold was optioned back to Worcester in late July, and recalled to Boston for a week in late September. In five starts with Boston, Seabold went 0–4 with an 11.29 ERA while striking out 19 batters in  innings.

On January 12, 2023, Seabold was designated for assignment when the team added Corey Kluber to the roster.

Colorado Rockies
On January 17, 2023, Seabold was traded to the Colorado Rockies in exchange for a player to be named later or cash.

Personal life
Seabold has two younger brothers, Cade and Carson; their mother died in August 2015 at age 45 following a battle with cancer.

References

External links

1996 births
Living people
People from Laguna Hills, California
Baseball players from California
Major League Baseball pitchers
Boston Red Sox players
United States national baseball team players
Cal State Fullerton Titans baseball players
Clearwater Threshers players
Florida Complex League Red Sox players
Florida Complex League Phillies players
Reading Fightin Phils players
Scottsdale Scorpions players
Williamsport Crosscutters players
Yarmouth–Dennis Red Sox players
Worcester Red Sox players